Louis Cameron Gossett Jr. (born May 27, 1936) is an American actor. He was a folk singer in the 1960s. He is best known for his role as Gunnery Sergeant Emil Foley in the 1982 film An Officer and a Gentleman, winning him the Academy Award for Best Supporting Actor.  He also won an Emmy Award for his role as Fiddler in the 1977 ABC television miniseries Roots.

Gossett has also starred in numerous other film productions including A Raisin in the Sun, The Landlord, Skin Game, Travels with My Aunt, The Laughing Policeman, The White Dawn, The Deep, Jaws 3-D, Wolfgang Petersen's Enemy Mine, The Principal, the Iron Eagle series, Toy Soldiers and The Punisher, in an acting career that spans over five decades.

Filmography

Film

Television

Theatre 

 1964: Supporting role in the Broadway musical adaptation of Odets' Golden Boy.
 2006: Dvorak's New World: Chamber Music Plus. Louis Gossett Jr., narrator, with Aubrey Allicock (Baritone), Sanda Schuldmann (piano), and Harry Clark (writer).

References

Male actor filmographies
American filmographies